Tilburg University is a public research university specializing in the social and behavioral sciences, economics, law, business sciences, theology and humanities, located in Tilburg in the southern part of the Netherlands.

Tilburg University has a student population of about 20,284 students, about 18 percent of whom are international students. This percentage has steadily increased over the past years. Tilburg University offers both Dutch-and English-taught programs. In 2019, 48 of the total 71 (21 bachelor and 50 master programs) were English-taught. Tilburg University awards approximately 120 PhDs per year.

The institution has gained a reputation in both research and education. In the field of economics, RePEc in March 2020 ranked the Faculty of Economics and Business Administration as the 23rd most productive research department in the world, and the 6th in Europe. According to the 2019 Shanghai Ranking, Tilburg University is ranked 5th in the field of Business Administration and 12th in the field of Finance worldwide. In the field of Law, Tilburg University was ranked #1 in the Netherlands for the last three years according to Elsevier Magazine.

History
Tilburg University was founded in 1927, as the Roomsch Katholieke Handelshoogeschool (Roman Catholic University of Commerce), being located in the southern, Catholic part of The Netherlands, visible in its second change of name in 1938: Katholieke Economische Hogeschool (Catholic Economic University). In 1963 the university was once again renamed, as Katholieke Hogeschool Tilburg (Catholic University Tilburg), followed by a name change to Katholieke Universiteit Brabant (Catholic University Brabant). Although in its present name Tilburg University, the word Catholic was dropped, the university is still regarded as a Catholic university.

1969 protests

On 28 April 1969, students barricaded the campus buildings, demanding educational and organizational changes. Months before students had unofficially renamed the university Karl Marx University, painting this title across campus to accentuate the importance of Marxist ideas in the then primarily economics-oriented curriculum. These protests led to a widespread change in higher education across the Netherlands that was made official by the 1971 bill of Educational Reform, granting more joint decision making to students of Dutch universities.

Rankings

Tilburg University is a specialised university and has a strong focus on Social Sciences and Economics. In 2020 three major university rankings (QS World University Ranking, THE World University Rankings and US News Best Global Universities) listed Tilburg among the top 40 in the world and top 10 in Europe for Economics.

In 2020, Tilburg University was ranked 17th worldwide and 4th in Europe in Economics & Business field, by the US News 2020 ranking. Times Higher Education in 2019 ranked it 28th in Economics & Business and 28th in Law globally in the 2021 ranking. The Shanghai Ranking lists Tilburg as the 5th best university in Business Administration in the world, 12th in Finance and 27th in Management.

Education
The Tilburg School of Economics and Management (founded in 1927) is the oldest and largest faculty of the university. The other four faculties—Law (1963), Social and Behavioural Sciences (1963), Philosophy and Theology (1967), Arts (1981)—were founded more recently. In addition to these faculties, Tilburg University has a number of research centers and graduate schools (see below).

Undergraduate programs

Tilburg University offers a wide range of undergraduate studies, some of which are English-taught.

Tilburg School of Economics and Management
International Business Administration
Business Economics
Economics
Econometrics and Operations Research
Finance (including CFA track)
International Management
Fiscal Economics
Entrepreneurship and Business Innovation

Tilburg Law School
Administrative Law and Public Administration
Dutch Law
Tax law
Global Law LLB
Public Governance

School of Social and Behavioral Sciences
Human Resources Studies
Organisation Studies
Psychology (medical psychology, neuropsychology, pediatric psychology, clinical psychology, social psychology, cultural psychology)
 Global Management of Social Issues
Sociology

School of Humanities and Digital Sciences
Communication and Information Sciences
Online Culture (General Culture Studies)
Online Culture: Art, Media and Society
Philosophy
Cognitive Science and Artificial Intelligence

School of Theology
Catholic Theology (in cooperation with Utrecht University)

University College Tilburg
Liberal Arts & Sciences

Joint Bachelor Data Science (in cooperation with Eindhoven University of Technology)

Graduate programs
Tilburg University offers a range of graduate and doctoral programs, most of these are English-taught.

Research
Research centres and institutes
 Babylon – Centre for Studies of the Multicultural Society
  CentER – Center for Economic Research
 CentER Applied Research
 CentERdata
 Center for Innovation Research
 Centre for Intercultural Ethics
 Centre for Religious Communication
 Center for Language Studies
 CoRPS – Center of Research on Psychology in Somatic diseases
 Centrum voor Maatschappelijk Ondernemen
 FIT – Tilburg Institute of Fiscal Law
 Globus – Institute for Globalization and Sustainable Development
 Infolab – Research group on Information and Communication Technology
 INTERVICT – International Victimology Institute Tilburg
 IVA – Tilburg Institute for Social Policy Research and Consultancy
 IVO – Development Research Institute
 Liturgical Institute
 Center for Meta-Research
 Netspar – Network for Studies on Pensions, Aging and Retirement
 Nexus Institute
 Oldendorff Research Institute and Graduate School – Social and Behavioural Sciences
 OSA – Institute for Labour Studies
 Tilburg Center of Entrepreneurship
 Tilburg Graduate Law school (formerly Schoordijk Institute) – Institute of Jurisprudence and Comparative Law
 Telos
 Brabant Institute for Sustainability Issues
 TIBER – Tilburg Institute for Behavioral Economics Research
 Ticer – Tilburg Innovation Centre for Electronic Resources
 TiCC – Tilburg Centre for Cognition and Communication
 TICOM – Tilburg Institute of Comparative and Transnational Law
 Tilburg Center of Finance
 TISCO – Tilburg Institute for Interdisciplinary Studies of Civil Law and Conflict Resolution Systems
 TILT – Tilburg Institute for Law, Technology, and Society
 TILEC –Tilburg Law and Economics Centre
 TiLPS – Tilburg Center for Logic and Philosophy of Science
 Tisser – Tilburg Institute for Social and Socio-Economic Research

Research and graduate schools
 CentER Graduate School (Economics and Business Administration)
 Research school for legislative studies (Law)

Notable alumni and faculty members

 Wim de Bie – writer, satirist, comedian
 Lans Bovenberg – economist
 Wim van de Donk – politician
 Afshin Ellian – professor of law, philosopher, poet, critic of Islam
 Max Euwe – chess Grandmaster, mathematician, former President of FIDE
 Jackie Groenen - Dutch footballer
 Ernst Hirsch Ballin – former Dutch Minister of Justice
 Geert Hofstede – social psychologist, anthropologist (see Hofstede's cultural dimensions theory)
 Servais Knaven – cyclist
 Ruud Lubbers –  former Prime Minister of the Netherlands, United Nations High Commissioner for Refugees (2001–2005)
 Paul Scheffer
 Norbert Schmelzer – former Dutch Minister of Foreign Affairs
 Diederik Stapel – founder of the Tilburg Institute for Behavioral Economics Research, later dismissed for fabricating data.
 Max van der Stoel – politician, first High Commissioner of Organization for Security and Co-operation in Europe
 Cees Veerman – former Dutch Minister of Agriculture
 Jan Vranken - Professor of law
 Herman Wijffels – economist and politician
 In 2002, Tilburg University awarded honorary doctorates to Kofi Annan and Prof. Ariel Rubinstein in the presence of Queen Beatrix and Crown Prince Willem-Alexander.
 Willem Witteveen – legal scholar, politician, and author
 Joseph A. McCahery – corporate lawyers, researcher and institutional adviser
 Ralph Hamers –  Dutch businessman, the chief executive officer (CEO) of ING Group since October 2013
 Jacques van den Broek - CEO of Randstad Holding since March 2014

References

External links

TIAS School for Business and Society
Tilburg University Datasets

 
Educational institutions established in 1927
1927 establishments in the Netherlands
Catholic universities and colleges in the Netherlands
Articles containing video clips
Education in North Brabant
Buildings and structures in Tilburg